Penge, alternatively known as Mabulane, is a township in Sekhukhune District Municipality in the Limpopo province of South Africa.

Mining village on the Lepelle River, 37 km north of Burgersfort. It was established after amosite was discovered there in 1907. Named after Kgosi Mabulane of Roka Motshana tribal authority or alternatively Penge, a suburb of London.

References

Populated places in the Fetakgomo Tubatse Local Municipality
Mining communities in South Africa